Charles Philip Latham (17 January 1929 – 20 June 2020) was a British television actor.

He was educated at Felsted School and the Royal Academy of Dramatic Art, from which he graduated in 1951.

In the late 1960s/early 1970s he was well known to British TV viewers for his portrayal of chief accountant Willy Izard, the "conscience" to hard-nosed oil company industrialist Brian Stead (played by Geoffrey Keen) in the BBC series The Troubleshooters (1965–72). Other credits Jesus of Nazareth (1956), Paul of Tarsus, Danger Man (1960–1962), Maigret, The Treasure Seekers, The Avengers, Love Story, Undermind, UFO, The Saint, Sergeant Cork, Justice, The Cedar Tree, Killers, Hammer House of Horror,  The Professionals, No. 10, and Nanny.

One of his horror film roles was as Dracula's sinister servant Klove in Hammer's 1966 film Dracula, Prince of Darkness, and he had previously worked for Hammer in The Devil-Ship Pirates and The Secret of Blood Island (both 1964). His other film roles included appearances in Ring of Spies (1964), Spy Story (1976) and Force 10 from Navarone (1978). On television he played the joint-lead role of Plantagenet Palliser (opposite Susan Hampshire) in the 26-part BBC series The Pallisers. He also played Lord President Borusa in the 1983 20th anniversary episode of Doctor Who, The Five Doctors.

Filmography

References

External links

1929 births
2020 deaths
English male television actors
Male actors from London
People educated at Felsted School